Callia chrysomelina is a species of beetle in the family Cerambycidae. It was described by Pascoe in 1859. It is known from Brazil and Ecuador.

References

Calliini
Beetles described in 1859